Bernard Lenoir (born 13 September 1945) is a former radio presenter.

He was born in Algeria, which he left in 1962, working on the Côte d'Azur as a DJ. He briefly san in a surf pop group called Les Radis Beurre.  Lenoir began on France Inter as a music programmer on veteran presenter José Artur's Pop-Club show. He worked through the late 1970s presenting the rock programme  Feedback, and continued on with it into the 1980s. 

The show was cancelled after one season and Lenoir transferred to Europe 1. He also appeared on the television programme Les Enfants du rock.

In September 1990, Lenoir resumed broadcasting on France Inter in the evening shift.  His programme, which ran until the 2010–2011 season, was first called L'Inrockuptible, after the magazine Les Inrockuptibles, and later renamed C'est Lenoir (This is Lenoir).

He is currently retired in Biarritz, France.

See also
 C'est Lenoir
 John Peel
 Hugo Cassavetti
 Yves Thibord
 Jean-Daniel Beauvallet
 Michka Assayas
 Ivan Smagghe
 Lydie Barbarian
 António Sérgio

References

External links
 Site de l'émission C'est Lenoir
 Article de présentation sur le site « M la Music »
 Biographie chronologique du parrain de la Route du rock

1946 births
Living people
French radio presenters